Acacia umbellata  is a species of wattle native to northern Australia.

References

umbellata